Wushe Dam is a gravity dam forming Wushe Reservoir, also called Wanda Reservoir and Bihu, on the Wushe Creek, a tributary of the Zhuoshui River, located in Ren-ai Township, Nantou County, Taiwan. The dam was completed in 1960 after seven years of construction, and serves mainly to generate hydroelectric power.

Background

When Taiwan was under Japanese rule in 1934, hydroelectric plants were constructed at Sun Moon Lake to generate power from the fall of the Zhuoshui River. The Japanese also sought to build power stations upstream on Wushe Creek and Wanda Creek, the two main tributaries that combine to form the Zhuoshui. A reservoir would be required to control the flow of water to the power stations and serve the dual purposes of flood control and trapping sediment.

When World War II broke out in 1941, industrial resources were increasingly diverted to the war effort and construction was halted in 1944 with only the power plants and 6 percent of the dam complete. After the war, Taiwan Power Company (Taipower) took over the project with aid from the United States Agency for International Development. Construction resumed in May 1953. The reservoir first filled in 1957, and the project was officially completed in August 1960, at a cost of NT$376,077,000.

Specifications

Construction details
Altogether, the dam contains  of concrete.

However, like many reservoirs of Taiwan, it has suffered heavily from siltation, especially after Typhoon Morakot in 2009.

Power station

In 1943, it began generating power using water from Wanda Creek, which joins with the Wushe Creek here to form the Zhuoshui River. The three Pelton turbines installed at the time are known as unit G3 and have a capacity of 15,000 kilowatts (KW).

G1 and G2 have a capacity of 20,700 KW each. In 2012 unit G4 was installed, providing an additional capacity of 19,700 KW. All three units are powered by vertical-axis Francis turbines, and generate about 182 million kilowatt hours (KWh) per year.

The Songlin Power Station is located downstream and generates power from the combined outflow of G1 through G4. It consists of two Francis turbines powering two 20,900 KW generators.

In 2012 Taipower began an overhaul of the power station, installing three new generators and upgrading a fourth. On September 13, 2013 the installation was completed, replacing aged equipment that had been in use since the late 1950s.

See also

List of dams and reservoirs in Taiwan
Minghu Dam
Mingtan Dam
Sun Moon Lake
Wujie Dam
Electricity sector in Taiwan

References

External links

Current water levels at Taiwan reservoirs (Chinese)

1960 establishments in Taiwan
Arch-gravity dams
Dams completed in 1960
Dams in Nantou County
Hydroelectric power stations in Taiwan